The PSDB Cidadania Federation, participating in elections as the Always Forward Federation, is a federation of Brazilian parties formed in 2022 by the Brazilian Social Democracy Party (PSDB) and Cidadania. Its program and statute were published on 11 May 2022 and registered by the Superior Electoral Court on 26 May.

Composition
The federation consists of two political parties:

Electoral history

Legislative elections

References

2022 establishments in Brazil
Political parties established in 2022
Political party alliances in Brazil